The Towns River is a river in the Northern Territory, Australia.

The headwaters of the river rise in Arnhem Land and flow in an easterly direction and eventually discharges into the Limmen Bight within the Gulf of Carpentaria.

The estuary formed at the river mouth is tidal in nature and in near pristine condition. It is river dominated in nature with a tide dominated delta having single channel and is surrounded by an area of  covered with mangroves.

Ten species of fish are found in the river including; glassfish, Barred Grunter, Fly-specked Hardyhead, Salmon Catfish, Mouth Almighty, Barramundi, Rainbowfish and Bony Bream.

Believed to have been named by the explorer Francis Cadell during his expedition of 1868, he named it for Robert Towns, the person that the city of Townsville is also named after. The name also appears on Goyder's pastoral compilation of 1888.

See also

List of rivers of Northern Territory

References

Rivers of the Northern Territory
Arnhem Land
Gulf of Carpentaria